Kotoge (written: 小峠) is a Japanese surname. Notable people with the surname include:

Atsushi Kotoge (born 1985), Japanese professional wrestler
Eiji Kotoge, Japanese comedian from the comedy duo Viking

Japanese-language surnames